Fixtape is the fourth studio album by Jamaican musician Popcaan. It was released on 7 August 2020 via OVO Sound and Warner Records. Production was handled by several record producers, including Boi-1da, London on da Track, Nineteen85, Noel Cadastre and Popcaan himself. It features guest appearances from Drake, Dane Ray, Frahcess One, French Montana, Jada Kingdom, Masicka, PartyNextDoor, Preme, Stylo G and Tommy Lee. The album peaked at number 15 on the Canadian Albums Chart and at number 94 on the Billboard 200. It was promoted by two pre-released singles: "Mamakita" and "Buzz", while "Twist & Turn" features Drake and PartyNextDoor and was released as the third single by being sent to urban contemporary radio on 1 September.

Track listing

Personnel

Vocalists

Andrae Hugh "Popcaan" Sutherland – primary artist
Waldane "Dane Ray" Hampton – featured artist (track 3)
Jason "Stylo G" McDermott – featured artist (track 3)
Jahron "PartyNextDoor" Brathwaite – featured artist (track 4)
Aubrey Drake Graham – featured artist (tracks: 4, 11)
Masicka – featured artist (track 9)
Tommy Lee – featured artist (track 9)
Frahcess One – featured artist (track 10)
Jada Kingdom – featured artist (track 12)
Raynford "Preme" Humphrey – featured artist (track 14)
Karim "French Montana" Kharbouch – featured artist (track 14)

Instrumentalists

Andrae Hugh Sutherland – keyboards & programming (tracks: 1, 13, 16, 17)
Damian "Mini E5" Gager – keyboards & programming (tracks: 2, 3, 9, 10)
Remmel "Two4Kay" Brown – keyboards & programming (track 2)
Andrian Francis – keyboards & programming (tracks: 3, 10)
Curtis James – keyboards & programming (tracks: 3, 10)
Mark Waxkirsh – keyboards & programming (tracks: 3, 10)
Paul "Nineteen85" Jefferies – keyboards & programming (track 4)
Linton "TJ Records" White – keyboards & programming (track 5)
Jammy "Jam 2" James – keyboards & programming (track 6)
Andre "Spider" Dennis – keyboards & programming (track 6)
Markus "Markus Records" Myrie – keyboards & programming (track 7)
Darren "Jaxx Records" Jack – keyboards & programming (track 7)
Waldane Hampton – keyboards & programming (tracks: 8, 13)
Christopher James Hamer – keyboards & programming (track 9)
Stephen Hicham Ched-di – keyboards & programming (track 9)
Noel Cadastre – keyboards & programming (track 11)
Matthew "Boi-1da" Samuels – keyboards & programming (track 12)
London "London on da Track" Holmes – keyboards & programming (track 14)
Kirk "Louie Vito" Clarke – keyboards & programming (tracks: 15, 19)
Borial Thomas – keyboards & programming (track 17)
Rasheed "JoshSkull" Sutherland – keyboards & programming (track 18)
Charles "Kraiggi Badart" Doran – keyboards & programming (track 19)
Noah "40" Shebib – additional arranger (track 4)
Dwayne "Supa Dups" Chin-Quee – additional instrumentation (track 11)

Production

Popcaan – producer (tracks: 1, 13, 16, 17)
Damian "Mini E5" Gager – producer (tracks: 2, 3, 9, 10)
Remmel "Two4Kay" Brown – producer (track 2)
Andrian Francis – producer (tracks: 3, 10)
Curtis James – producer (tracks: 3, 10)
Mark Waxkirsh – producer (tracks: 3, 10)
Paul "Nineteen85" Jefferies – producer (track 4)
Linton "TJ Records" White – producer (track 5)
Jammy "Jam 2" James – producer (track 6)
Andre "Spider" Dennis – producer (track 6)
Markus "Markus Records" Myrie – producer (track 7)
Darren "Jaxx Records" Jack – producer (track 7)
Dane Ray – producer (tracks: 8, 13)
Christopher James Hamer – producer (track 9)
Stephen Hicham Ched-di – producer (track 9)
Noel Cadastre – producer (track 11)
Matthew "Boi-1da" Samuels – producer (track 12)
London Holmes – producer (track 14)
Kirk "Louie Vito" Clarke – producer (tracks: 15, 19)
Borial Thomas – producer (track 17)
Rasheed "JoshSkull" Sutherland – producer (track 18)
Charles "Kraiggi Badart" Doran – producer (track 19)
Noah "40" Shebib – vocal producer (track 4)
Taranchyla – vocal producer (track 11)

Technicals

Dale "Dizzle" Virgo – mixing (tracks: 1, 3, 6, 9, 18), mastering (tracks: 2, 5)
Remmel "Two4Kay" Brown – mixing (track 2)
Noah "40" Shebib – mixing (track 4)
Mark Collinder – mixing (track 5)
Dre Day – mixing (track 7)
Waldane "Dane Ray" Hampton – mixing (tracks: 8, 13, 15, 16), recording (tracks: 1–5, 8, 9, 12–16), mastering (track 15)
Noel Cadastre – mixing (track 11), recording (tracks: 4, 11)
Jaycen Joshua – mixing (track 12)
Amir "AmirJamm" Jammalieh – mixing (track 14)
Dohnzhey "Sasaine" Grindley – mixing & recording & mastering (track 17)
Jacob Richards – assistant mixing (track 12)
Mike Seaberg – assistant mixing (track 12)
DJ Riggins – assistant mixing (track 12)
Prep Bijan – recording (track 4)
Jammy "Jam 2" James – recording (track 6)
Markus Myrie – recording (track 7)
Marlon Easy – recording (track 18)
Kirk "Louie Vito" Clarke – recording (track 19)
Chris Athens – mastering (tracks: 1, 3, 4, 6-11, 13, 14, 16, 18, 19)
Dave Huffman – assistant mastering (tracks: 1, 3, 4, 6-11, 13, 14, 16, 18, 19)

Charts

References

Popcaan albums
OVO Sound albums
2020 mixtape albums
Albums produced by Boi-1da
Albums produced by Nineteen85
Albums produced by London on da Track